Robert Melvin Allmann (May 24, 1914September 10, 1999) was an American football end who played one season in the National Football League (NFL) for the Chicago Bears. He also played for the Los Angeles Bulldogs. Allman played college football at Michigan State and was selected in the 4th round of the 1936 NFL Draft. He died at his home in Los Osos, California, in September, 1999.

References

External links

1914 births
1999 deaths
People from Alma, Michigan
Players of American football from Michigan
Michigan State Spartans football players
Chicago Bears players
Los Angeles Bulldogs players